Šašinci is a village in Serbia. It is located in the Sremska Mitrovica municipality, in the Srem District, Vojvodina province. The village has a Serb ethnic majority and its population numbering 1,830 people (2002 census).

Name
In Serbian, the village is known as Šašinci (Шашинци), in Croatian as Šašinci, and in Hungarian as Sasinc. The name of the village in Serbian is plural.

Historical population

1961: 2,106
1971: 2,067
1981: 1,983
1991: 1,928

See also
List of places in Serbia
List of cities, towns and villages in Vojvodina

References
Slobodan Ćurčić, Broj stanovnika Vojvodine, Novi Sad, 1996.

Populated places in Syrmia
Sremska Mitrovica